The National History Museum was the second national museum in Malaysia after the National Museum. It was located opposite Dataran Merdeka in Kuala Lumpur. As of November 2007 it is closed and the entire collection has been moved to the National Museum.

National History Museum exhibited unique historical development of the homeland of the early days until now. There are almost a thousand gathered a collection based on its importance to the history of the country, and are classified into several categories such as: weapons, manuscripts, maps, money, seals and stone tools.

Gallery

See also
 List of museums in Malaysia

Literature

References

External links

 National History Museum

Museums in Kuala Lumpur